Frederik Jan (Frits) van Hall (8 May 1899 (Suikerfabriek Bodja near Semarang)  – 18 January 1945 (Gliwice)) was a Dutch sculptor executed for his role in the Dutch resistance in 1945.

Frits was born near Semarang in the Dutch East Indies. His family returned to the Netherlands in 1905. His sister, the dancer Suzy van Hall, was born in 1907.

His work includes the Van Heutsz monument, the Moerdijk monument and the decoration of the Enschede town hall.

Gallery

References

1899 births
1945 deaths
Dutch sculptors
Dutch resistance members
Resistance members killed by Nazi Germany
Executed Dutch people
People from Semarang